Richardson Beach (also known as Richardson Ocean Park) is a Hawaii County park located just east of Hilo, Hawaii, on the Big Island of Hawaii. Adjacent is the Lele'iwi Beach Park.

History 
The name Richardson comes from its original owners, Elsa and George Richardson, whose home still stands there. George Richardson was the former Chief Detective of the County of Hawaii, and received the land as a gift of gratitude from the Malo family.  In 1920, when the entire Malo family was stricken with typhoid fever, Elena, the least severely afflicted of them all, walked to the home of George Richardson on Reeds Bay to seek help.

Richardson, a part-Hawaiian originally from Kohala, regularly fished up and down the Keaukaha coastline in his boat and had become a close friend of David Malo's. When Elena showed up on his doorstep with the terrible news, he immediately put her on board his boat, the fastest means of transportation then available, and returned to the Malo home. There he gathered up the rest of the family and headed for Hilo and the hospital. In spite of these valiant efforts, two of the children died.

After the family returned home to convalesce, Richardson continued to look in on them and see to their welfare by bringing medicine and other necessities. Malo felt deeply indebted to Richardson, believing that without his help he might have lost his entire family. When he was fully recovered, Malo suggested that Richardson build a home on the Malo property if he wished, and that he consider the land as his own. Richardson accepted the offer, and in the early 1920s constructed a large house on the property. Malo helped design the structure, recommending the large doors at the front and back of the house to provide a corridor for the periodic inundations by high winter surf and tsunami. This plan did actually save the building on a number of occasions when the ocean flooded through the house rather than carrying it away.

Location 

Today the beach is a public park, and the home is occupied and operated as the Richardson Ocean Center.

Richardson Beach is the only beach in the Hilo area with black sand and green sand. Monk Seals and turtles frequent this area as well.

It is located near the end of Kalanianaole Avenue at coordinates , where Leleiwi Street leads to an undeveloped coastal access area known as Lehia Park.

References

Beaches of Hawaii (island)
Parks in Hawaii
Protected areas of Hawaii (island)
Black sand beaches